cAMP-specific 3',5'-cyclic phosphodiesterase 4A is an enzyme that in humans is encoded by the PDE4A gene.

Function 

The protein encoded by this gene belongs to the cyclic nucleotide phosphodiesterase (PDE) family, and PDE4 subfamily. This PDE hydrolyzes the secondary messenger, cAMP, which is a regulator and mediator of a number of cellular responses to extracellular signals. Thus, by regulating the cellular concentration of cAMP, this protein plays a key role in many important physiological processes.  Recently, it has been shown through the use of PDE4A knock out mice that PDE4A may play a role in the regulation of anxiety and emotional memory.

Clinical significance 

PDE4A inhibition is a target of a number of drugs including:
 rolipram (antidepressant and antiinflammatory) and cilomilast (antiinflammatory) – inhibits PDE4A isoforms 1, 2, 6, and 7
 roflumilast (antiinflammatory) – inhibits PDE4A isoforms 1, 2, and 6

References

Further reading